Nonparametric statistics is the branch of statistics that is not based solely on parametrized families of probability distributions (common examples of parameters are the mean and variance). Nonparametric statistics is based on either being distribution-free or having a specified distribution but with the distribution's parameters unspecified. Nonparametric statistics includes both descriptive statistics and statistical inference. Nonparametric tests are often used when the assumptions of parametric tests are violated.

Definitions

The term "nonparametric statistics" has been imprecisely defined in the following two ways, among others:

Applications and purpose
Non-parametric methods are widely used for studying populations that take on a ranked order (such as movie reviews receiving one to four stars).  The use of non-parametric methods may be necessary when data have a ranking but no clear numerical interpretation, such as when assessing preferences. In terms of levels of measurement, non-parametric methods result in ordinal data.

As non-parametric methods make fewer assumptions, their applicability is much wider than the corresponding parametric methods.  In particular, they may be applied in situations where less is known about the application in question.  Also, due to the reliance on fewer assumptions, non-parametric methods are more robust.

Another justification for the use of non-parametric methods is simplicity.  In certain cases, even when the use of parametric methods is justified, non-parametric methods may be easier to use.  Due both to this simplicity and to their greater robustness, non-parametric methods are seen by some statisticians as leaving less room for improper use and misunderstanding.

The wider applicability and increased robustness of non-parametric tests comes at a cost: in cases where a parametric test would be appropriate, non-parametric tests have less power.  In other words, a larger sample size can be required to draw conclusions with the same degree of confidence.

Non-parametric models
Non-parametric models differ from parametric models in that the model structure is not specified a priori but is instead determined from data. The term non-parametric is not meant to imply that such models completely lack parameters but that the number and nature of the parameters are flexible and not fixed in advance.
 A histogram is a simple nonparametric estimate of a probability distribution.
 Kernel density estimation is another method to estimate a probability distribution.
 Nonparametric regression and semiparametric regression methods have been developed based on kernels, splines, and wavelets.
 Data envelopment analysis provides efficiency coefficients similar to those obtained by multivariate analysis without any distributional assumption.
 KNNs classify the unseen instance based on the K points in the training set which are  nearest to it.
 A support vector machine (with a Gaussian kernel) is a nonparametric large-margin classifier.
 The method of moments with polynomial probability distributions.

Methods
Non-parametric (or distribution-free) inferential statistical methods are mathematical procedures for statistical hypothesis testing which, unlike parametric statistics, make no assumptions about the probability distributions of the variables being assessed. The most frequently used tests include

History
Early nonparametric statistics include the median (13th century or earlier, use in estimation by Edward Wright, 1599; see ) and the sign test by John Arbuthnot (1710) in analyzing the human sex ratio at birth (see ).

See also
 CDF-based nonparametric confidence interval
 Parametric statistics
 Resampling (statistics)
 Semiparametric model

Notes

General references
 Bagdonavicius, V., Kruopis, J., Nikulin, M.S. (2011). "Non-parametric tests for complete data", ISTE & WILEY: London & Hoboken. .
 
 Gibbons, Jean Dickinson; Chakraborti, Subhabrata (2003). Nonparametric Statistical Inference, 4th Ed.  CRC Press. .
  also .
 Hollander M., Wolfe D.A., Chicken E. (2014). Nonparametric Statistical Methods, John Wiley & Sons.
 Sheskin, David J. (2003) Handbook of Parametric and Nonparametric Statistical Procedures. CRC Press. 
 Wasserman, Larry (2007). All of Nonparametric Statistics, Springer. .

 
Statistical inference
Robust statistics
Mathematical and quantitative methods (economics)